Malek Jahan Khanom (26 February 1805 – 2 April 1873) was the wife of Mohammad Shah Qajar of Persia and the mother of Naser al-Din Shah. She was the de facto regent of Persian Empire for one month, from 5 September until 5 October in 1848, between the death of her husband and the accession to the throne of her son.

Life

Early life

Malek Jahan Khanom was a Persian princess of the Qajar dynasty by both birth and marriage. By birth, being the daughter of Amir Mohammad Qassem Khan Qajar Qovanlou 'Amir Kabir' and Princess Begom Jan Khanom Qajar, she was the granddaughter of Fath-Ali Shah Qajar of Persia. Her paternal grandfather was the powerful Qajar commander Amir Soleyman Khan Qajar Qovanlou 'Amir Kabir' 'Nezam od-Doleh' 'Etezad od-Doleh' and her paternal grandmother was a princess of the Zand dynasty.

Marriage

She was married at a young age to her cousin, Mohammad Shah Qajar of Persia (reign 1834–1848). Her husband married about fifteen women during his lifetime, but she was one of his earliest wives. She held prestige within the harem for several reasons: because of her seniority among the Shah's wives; because she was a member of the family by birth and therefore well-networked and well-versed in their ways; because she bore her husband as many as five children (two of whom reached adulthood) and most of all because she was the mother of the crown prince.

Her only surviving son, Naser al-Din Shah Qajar, would succeed his father to the throne of Persia. Her title Mehd-i-aulia or Mehd-e-olia means "Sublime Cradle" and this title was generally bestowed on the mother of the heir apparent.

Widowhood

As widow, she was the de facto regent of Persian Empire for one month, from 5 September until 5 October in 1848, between the death of her husband and the accession to the throne of her son.

As queen mother, she exerted considerable political influence during the reign of her son from 1848 until her death in 1873. She is described as a strong personality and politically gifted. Strongly rooted in family and clan networks, she tended to favour and support the Qajar nobility rather than merited commoners, mostly because members of the Qajar family and clan had much better access to her as compared to outsiders.

References

External links

1805 births
1873 deaths
19th-century Iranian women
Qajar princesses
Qajar royal consorts